Kiban is a small town and commune in the Cercle of Banamba in the Koulikoro Region of south-western Mali. In 1998 the commune had a population of 9,781.

References

Communes of Koulikoro Region